Popular Action Grouping (in French: Groupement d'Action Populaire), was a political party in Upper Volta. GAP contested the 1970 elections, without any significant result.

Source: Englebert, Pierre. La Revolution Burkinabè. Paris: L'Harmattan, 1986.

Defunct political parties in Burkina Faso